Zoologicheskii Zhurnal (Zoological Journal) is a peer-reviewed scientific journal published in Russian covering research in zoology. The journal was established in 1916 by Aleksei Severtsov.

References

External links 
 

Zoology journals
Publications established in 1916
Russian-language journals
Monthly journals
Russian Academy of Sciences academic journals